The Barnaulka is a river in Altai Krai, Russia.

The basin of the river is located in the Rebrikhinsky, Shipunovsky and Pavlovsky districts. The city of Barnaul is named after the river. The Barnaulka suffers from the impact of pollutants released by industrial activity along its course.

Course 
The Barnaulka is a left tributary of the Ob river. It has its sources in Zerkalnoye, a lake with a  surface lying  to the west of Aleysk. The upper course of the river is a chain of lakes connected by marshy canals located in the Ob Plateau (Приобское плато). There are numerous swamps and smaller lakes in its basin. The Barnaulka flows in a roughly northeastern direction. Finally it meets the left bank of the Ob at Barnaul,  from the Ob's mouth.

Tributaries  
The river is largely fed by groundwater. It is frozen between November and April.

See also
Inland port
List of rivers of Russia

References

External links

Rivers of Altai Krai